Gold collar may refer to 
 Gold Collar, a prestigious competition in the UK greyhound calendar
Gold-collar workers

See also
 Livery collar, a gold chain of office, worn around the neck